Periklis Papapetrou (Greek: Περικλής Παπαπέτρου; 1947–2012) was a Greek architect and politician. He served as mayor of Eleusis and he was the first elected prefect of Western Attica, serving the prefectural government from 1994 to 2002.

Life and work 
He was born in Eleusis to parents of Arvanite descent. He then studied Architecture at the National Technical University of Athens and from his early student years he was active in politics and communal self-administration. He was elected in 1987 as mayor of Eleusis, acting as such until 1994. There he is known for his ecologically friendly policies including the carrying out of a referendum in 1991 against the expansion of the operating oil refinery of Hellenic Petroleum in Eleusis, which he won.

References 

Greek architects
Prefects of Greece
Mayors of places in Greece
1948 births
2012 deaths
Arvanites
People from Elefsina